Bitter Sweet is the thirty-fourth album by the jazz fusion group Casiopea recorded and released in 2000.

Track listing

Personnel 
CASIOPEA are
Issei Noro - Guitars, Synthesizer, Voice
Minoru Mukaiya - keyboards
Yoshihiro Naruse - Bass, Bass Synthesizer

Supported
Akira Jimbo - drums

Production 
 Sound Produced - CASIOPEA

 Recording & Mixing Engineer - Hiroyuki Shimura

Release history

References

External links
 

2000 albums
Casiopea albums
NBCUniversal Entertainment Japan albums
Pioneer Corporation albums